Type 100 can refer to:

Weaponry
 Mitsubishi Ki-21, medium bomber, some 100 converted to Army Type 100 Transport Model 1
 Mitsubishi Ki-46, also known as the Army Type 100 Command Reconnaissance Aircraft
 Mitsubishi Ki-57, also known as the Army Type 100 Transport Model 1
 Mitsubishi Type 100 air-cooled diesel V-12 engine used in a number of Japanese tanks including the Type 1 Chi-He
 Mitsubishi Type 100 air-cooled six-cylinder diesel engine used in the Type 98 Ke-Ni light tank
 Nakajima Ki-49, a medium bomber also known as the Army Type 100 Heavy Bomber Model 1
 Type 100 incendiary bomb, a 50 kg bomb, one of many Japanese World War II army bombs
 Type 100 smoke bomb, a 50 kg bomb, one of many Japanese World War II army bombs
 Type 100 submachine gun, Japanese weapon
 Type 100 rifle, one of three TERA rifles used by paratroopers
 Type 100 machine gun, Japanese weapon
 Type 100 flamethrower, Japanese weapon
 Type 100 armor-piercing tracer round, fired by the Type 98 20 mm AA Machine Cannon
 Type 100 high-explosive tracer round, fired by the Type 98 20 mm AA Machine Cannon
 Type 100 37 mm gun used on the Type 98 Ke-Ni light tank

Technology
 Type 100 tram as used in Adelaide, Australia, also known as Bombardier Flexity Classic
 Type 100 pack film, an instant film used in Land cameras

Fictional
 Type 100, a fictional weapon from the Mobile Suit Zeta Gundam series, Hyaku Shiki
 Yuria Type 100, a sex robot, the main character of the manga series Yuria 100 Shiki